Carl Eller (born January 25, 1942) is an American former professional football player who played as a defensive end in the National Football League (NFL) from 1964 through 1979. He was born in Winston-Salem, North Carolina and played college football for the Minnesota Golden Gophers. He was elected to the Pro Football Hall of Fame in 2004.

College career
As a sophomore at the University of Minnesota, Eller helped lead the Golden Gophers to a Rose Bowl victory.  While Eller shared the starting position as a sophomore, he became a full-time, two-way player as a junior and senior and was voted All-America both years. During his time in college, the Gophers were National Champions as well as Big Ten champions. As a senior (1963), Eller was the runner-up for the Outland Trophy. Following each football season, the Carl Eller Award is given to the University of Minnesota's Defensive Player of the Year. He was elected to the College Football Hall of Fame in 2006.

At the University of Minnesota, Eller joined Alpha Phi Alpha fraternity, via the Mu Chapter while at the University of Minnesota. In 1994, he graduated from Metropolitan State University in St. Paul, Minnesota with a bachelor's degree in human services.

NFL career
In 1964, Eller was drafted in the first round of the NFL draft by  the Minnesota Vikings. He was also drafted in the first round of the American Football League Draft by the Buffalo Bills, who could not sign him.  As the left defensive end in the Vikings front four, he was a major factor in the unit known as the "Purple People Eaters".

Starting in 1968, Eller's fifth campaign, Minnesota won 10 Central Division titles in the next 11 seasons. The Vikings won the NFL Championship in 1969, losing to the AFL Champion Kansas City Chiefs in Super Bowl IV, and won the NFC Championships in 1973, 1974, and 1976.  Eller was one of 11 Vikings to play in all four of their Super Bowls.

He was selected to play in six Pro Bowls (1968–1971, 1973, and 1974). After being traded with an eighth-round pick to Seattle Seahawks for defensive tackle Steve Niehaus, Eller played his final season in 1979 with the Seattle Seahawks, where he ran his career total to 225 games. In his career, "Moose" only missed three games and started 209 out of the 225 he played.

Eller is credited as the Vikings' all-time sack leader with 130½. He also had 3 sacks with the Seahawks in 1979 for a career total of 133½. He set a career high with 15 sacks in 1969 and matched that total in 1977; he also amassed 7 seasons with 10 or more sacks.

Eller was First-team All-NFL from 1968–71, and again in 1973. He was also Second-team All-Pro in 1967 and 1972 and was All-NFC by AP and The Sporting News in 1975. Matched with his Pro Bowls, Eller had a nine-year consecutive streak with some sort of post-season honor which began in 1967 with his Second-team All-pro selection and ended in 1975 with his All-NFC honors.

He was voted the winner of the George Halas Trophy in 1971 as the NFL's Defensive Player of the Year as awarded by the Newspaper Enterprise Association (NEA).

Life after football

As a licensed drug and alcohol counselor, Eller founded a group of substance-abuse clinics in the Twin Cities called Triumph Life Centers in 1986.
He obtained a college degree in Human Services from Metropolitan State University in 1994 and went on to work for the Minnesota Department of Human Services, addressing issues of health disparities between white people and people of color.

In 2000, Eller was named to the Vikings' 40th Anniversary Team and in 2010, he was named to the Vikings' 50th Anniversary team. In 2003, he was named to the Professional Football Researchers Association Hall of Very Good in the association's inaugural HOVG class. In 2004, Eller was elected to the Pro Football Hall of Fame. In 2006, he was inducted into the College Football Hall of Fame.

Eller was arrested in 2006 for driving under the influence and pleaded guilty. Eller was arrested in 2008 for fourth-degree assault of a police officer and second-degree refusal to submit to chemical testing, both gross misdemeanors. He was sentenced and served 60 days in the county workhouse.

Eller later served as president of the NFL Retired Players Association. In 2020, he joined the Halberd Corporation, a research-based publicly traded company that helps discover and develop medical treatments for diseases, as a consultant.

References

External links
 
 
 

1942 births
Living people
African-American players of American football
All-American college football players
American football defensive linemen
American substance abuse counselors
College Football Hall of Fame inductees
Minnesota Golden Gophers football players
Minnesota Vikings players
National Conference Pro Bowl players
National Football League announcers
Players of American football from Winston-Salem, North Carolina
Pro Football Hall of Fame inductees
Seattle Seahawks players
Western Conference Pro Bowl players
21st-century African-American people
20th-century African-American sportspeople